Mathieu Parent is a paralympic athlete from Canada competing mainly in category T54 wheelchair racing events.

Biography
Mathieu competed in six events at the 2000 Summer Paralympics covering the 200m, 400m, 800m, 1500m, and both relays.  His only medal success came in the 4 × 100 m relay where the Canadian team won the bronze medal.

References

Paralympic track and field athletes of Canada
Athletes (track and field) at the 2000 Summer Paralympics
Paralympic bronze medalists for Canada
Living people
Medalists at the 2000 Summer Paralympics
Year of birth missing (living people)
Paralympic medalists in athletics (track and field)
Canadian male wheelchair racers